Lương Cường (born 15 August 1957) is a Vietnamese Army general and Director of the General Department of Politics of Vietnam. He was born on 15 August 1957 in Viet Tri District, Phu Tho Province, Vietnam. He became member of the Communist Party of Vietnam on 19 January 2011.

Lương Cường was previously Vice Chief of the General Department of Politics (2011–16), and was promoted to four-star General in 2019.

Rank 

 Major General 2005
 Lieutenant General 2009
 Colonel General 2014
 Army General 2019

References 

Generals of the People's Army of Vietnam
People from Phú Thọ province
Living people
1957 births
Members of the 13th Politburo of the Communist Party of Vietnam
Members of the 12th Secretariat of the Communist Party of Vietnam
Members of the 11th Central Committee of the Communist Party of Vietnam
Members of the 12th Central Committee of the Communist Party of Vietnam
Members of the 13th Central Committee of the Communist Party of Vietnam